George J. Popplein (August, 1840 – March 31, 1901) was an American professional baseball player who appeared in one game for the Baltimore Marylands during the 1873 season.
He was born in Baltimore, Maryland and died there at the age of 60.

External links

Baseball players from Baltimore
Baltimore Marylands players
Major League Baseball outfielders
Major League Baseball shortstops
1840 births
1901 deaths
19th-century baseball players